The Huckleberry Fire Lookout in Glacier National Park is significant as one of a chain of staffed fire lookout posts within the park. The low two-story timber-construction structure with a pyramidal roof was built in 1933, replacing a similar structure built in 1923. It is one of several similar structures built to a modified version of a plan developed by the U.S. Forest Service.

References

Government buildings completed in 1933
Towers completed in 1933
Fire lookout towers on the National Register of Historic Places in Montana
Rustic architecture in Montana
National Register of Historic Places in Flathead County, Montana
1933 establishments in Montana
National Register of Historic Places in Glacier National Park